Didehban (also Romanized as Dīdehbān and Dīdeh Bān) is a village in Mishab-e Shomali Rural District, in the Central District of Marand County, East Azerbaijan Province, Iran. At the 2006 census, its population was 677, in 157 families.

References 

Populated places in Marand County